Bankend may refer to:
Bankend, Dumfries and Galloway, Scotland
Bankend, Saskatchewan, Canada
Bankend, South Lanarkshire, Scotland

See also
Bank End, a village in Cumbria, England